, also called KOF XV, is a fighting game developed by SNK. It was released on February 17, 2022, for PlayStation 4, PlayStation 5, Windows, and Xbox Series X/S. This is also the first game in The King of Fighters series created using Unreal Engine 4, and the first to implement GGPO rollback networking. Taking place after the events of The King of Fighters XIV, the narrative primarily revolves around two fighters with multiverse-related supernatural powers, Shun'ei and Isla, among other returning heroes facing revived threats. King of Fighters XV generally received praise for its character roster, team-based gameplay, and smooth online performance, but criticism for its story mode, complex tutorials, and mechanics. Player criticism has mainly been directed to the game's inability to find matches within a short period of time.

Gameplay

Like its predecessors, The King of Fighters XV uses a fighting system involving teams composed of three fighters. The parry system also returns under the name Shatter Strike. It also reincorporates the common MAX Mode system where fighters can use stronger techniques once energy bars are filled. The game features a wide variety of online modes, including Ranked Match, Casual Match, Room Match, and Online Training.

The single button "Rush" from The King of Fighters XIV reappears and is updated to help newcomers perform combos and special/super moves easier. Shatter Strike was designed mainly as a defensive system but it can be used offensively when making use of guard points. Destructoid compared Shatter Strike with a fully charged Focus Attack from Street Fighter IV. It will also be adjusted as it is apparently quite strong in the demo. In XIV, combos from quick activation were the main way max mode was used so the gauge consumption was increased from 1 to 2 to prevent players from being overwhelmed. A neutral state in XIV was not seen often so in XV attack power and guard crush are increased when neutral is activated. Since Max Mode activations in neutral were almost nonexistent in King of Fighters XIV, the developers are giving more incentive to players to not just use it as a combo extender.

Plot 
The story focuses on the next King of Fighters tournament held after the appearance and defeat of Verse. Following Antonov's early retirement, new tournament commissioner Anastasia sends out invitations to fighters to join the tournament; the mayhem caused by Verse's powers resurrects various long-thought deceased fighters from past tournaments as well. Chizuru Kagura gathers Kyo Kusanagi and Iori Yagami in order to look after the seal of the snake demon Orochi. Shun'ei, a teenager with mysterious powers resembling Verse's, enters the tournament again alongside Meitenkun and Benimaru Nikaido to better understand his powers, the Amplified Specters. During the tournament, they encounter a rival team led by a girl with similar powers to his own and also another Amp user, Isla. Isla is being mentored by a woman named Dolores who wishes for her and Shun'ei to stop the appearance of more Amp-related creatures like Verse, believing Ash Crimson's time-traveling in a previous tournament, which Dolores' disciple, Kukri confirms it to have caused their appearances and connected to distortions across the multiverse. However, a new Amp creature born from Isla's Amp power, labeled as Re Verse manifests as the tournament progresses and targets the fighters, pulling them into another world. Following Re Verse's defeat, the mysterious goddess Otoma=Raga appears and attacks the teams. Upon Otoma=Raga's defeat, the fighters escape back to their world and are crowned the new King of Fighters champions, whereas Isla finally warms up with Shun'ei at the same time their respective Amps are fully under control, such as Shun'ei can finally take off his headphone safely. As confirmed by Kukri earlier, defeating Otoma=Raga and Re Verse does not erase the revived fighters’ existences once they survive the two entities’ rampages.

Characters

The King of Fighters XV launched with 39 playable characters, consisting of 13 teams with three fighters each. Additional characters are available as paid downloadable content via "seasons" of content: Season 1 consists of 12 characters spread across four teams, while Season 2 consists of six individual characters, two of which are yet to be announced. Much like Samurai Shodown (2019) and SNK Heroines: Tag Team Frenzy, the DLC teams' involvements in the storyline are canon. The game features two non-playable bosses, while Omega Rugal appears as a playable character and special boss via free DLC.

Newcomers are marked in italics.

Initial Roster

Hero Team
Shun'ei
Meitenkun
Benimaru Nikaido

Sacred Treasures Team
Kyo Kusanagi
Iori Yagami
Chizuru Kagura

Fatal Fury Team
Terry Bogard
Andy Bogard
Joe Higashi

Orochi Team
Yashiro Nanakase
Shermie
Chris

Art of Fighting Team
Ryo Sakazaki
Robert Garcia
King

Ikari Team
Leona Heidern
Ralf Jones
Clark Still

Secret Agent Team
Blue Mary
Vanessa
Luong

Super Heroine Team
Athena Asamiya
Mai Shiranui
Yuri Sakazaki

G.A.W. (Galaxy Anton Wrestling) Team
Antonov
Ramón
The King of Dinosaurs

Rival Team
Isla
Heidern
Dolores

K' Team
K'
Maxima
Whip

Krohnen Team
Krohnen McDougall
Kula Diamond
Ángel

Ash Team
Ash Crimson
Elisabeth Blanctorche
Kukri

DLC Roster 

Garou Team
Rock Howard
B. Jenet
Gato

South Town Team
Geese Howard
Billy Kane
Ryuji Yamazaki

Awakened Orochi Team
Orochi Yashiro
Orochi Shermie
Orochi Chris

Samurai Team
Haohmaru
Nakoruru
Darli Dagger

Asian Brawlers Team
Shingo Yabuki
Kim Kaphwan
Shen Woo

Single Entry
Omega Rugal
Sylvie Paula Paula
Najd

Bosses 

Sub-Boss
Re Verse

Final Boss
Otoma=Raga

Boss Challenge
Omega Rugal

Development
Due to positive response to the marketing of The King of Fighters XIV, director Yasuyuki Oda said in August 2017 The King of Fighters XV was possible, but the company SNK also wanted to focus on other franchises. Oda instead worked on a spin-off, SNK Heroines: Tag Team Frenzy, a female character-driven fighting game and a spiritual sequel of SNK Gals' Fighters. In December 2018, SNK revealed the company was working on The King of Fighters XV, aiming to release it during 2020. Feeling the previous title had outdated graphics for a 2016 game, SNK chairman Zhihui Ge said that XV will use the Unreal Engine 4 to provide a better presentation. They decided to make XV while they were still working on XIV but only started development after Samurai Shodown was completed. At Evo 2019, SNK announced that the game was in development. The game's creative director is Eisuke Ogura, who has previously worked as an artist on the series, beginning with The King of Fighters 2001. Most notably, he served as the main illustrator for The King of Fighters XIII and XIV. The director of King of Fighters XIV, Yasuyuki Oda, serves as the producer for the title.

Originally, the game was set to be released in 2020. However, in late December, Oda and Ogura revealed the game would see release in 2021 with more content yet to be explored. During these announcements, the two developers revealed sketches of Shun'ei, Kyo Kusanagi and Benimaru Nikaido, with the former being set to be the protagonist of the new game. Ogura called it "our most ambitious KOF yet". An official trailer was set for January 7, 2021 but was delayed for unknown reasons alongside the downloadable content for  Samurai Shodown. The trailer was, instead, revealed the next day and included game footage of Kyo, Shun'ei, Benimaru, K', Mai Shiranui and Leona Heidern, while also confirming a 2021 release. The team focused on improving the visuals and increasing the fast-paced gameplay by adding new elements. The game was developed for PC and ninth generation of consoles, and supports ray tracing on these platforms. The PlayStation 4 version was also created with fans of The King of Fighters XIV in mind: SNK wanted to release the game while the console was still popular and expects this version to be used during major tournaments. Much attention to the character lineup was given due to the worldwide popularity of the series. In total, around 400 people were involved with game's development.

In February 2021, Oda announced on his personal Twitter account that the team is working on implementing rollback-based netcode for the game. The team aims to improve the gameplay and graphics while also providing a more interesting story than the one from XIV. SNK later confirmed that they were using GGPO for their rollback implementation.

In promoting the title, anime director Masami Ōbari (who previously worked on Fatal Fury: The Motion Picture and 1995 Technōs' Neo Geo fighting game title Voltage Fighter Gowcaizer along with the OVA adaptation) created and directed a short anime based on the series, with his animation studio, G-1Neo, producing the short anime. Yusuke Takeda and Hirotoshi Takaya have also worked on the short. In an interview with Famitsu, Ōbari has stated that he wanted this anime to be his best work yet, and that his team worked closely with SNK on the character design to make sure it has feature film level of detail put into every frame of animation. The song "Now or Never" by Steven McNair plays during the short, and is also used as the main theme of the game.

Cast and scenario
Character design is being handled by Tomohiro Nakata, who is also working on The King of Fighters All Star. Many returning characters received cosmetic changes. For example, Kyo Kusanagi was altered to overall look closer to his earlier appearances in the series, but different in other parts of his design like his jacket and gloves. The decision to revive characters killed off in previous KOF games was made during XIVs development and was based on XIIIs themes of energies connecting the past to the present through space and time and Oda wondering how that would affect things in the future. The deceased characters returning for XV were chosen based on fan requests and the aim of the roster was for it to have a 'fresh and festive feel'. They feel like the gathering of the KOF Heroes as well as the return of Team Sacred Treasures and Team Orochi helped them achieve this feeling. They brought back Clemence Bellamy, the story mode announcer from XIV, to appeal to the "tournament-likeness" of KOF and acknowledge that he was well received.

Previous KOF heroes Kyo, K' and Ash Crimson have been more independent protagonists, but Shun'ei is a little bit younger than them and is more of a mentally unstable character. Oda has compared Shun'ei to Rock Howard, and says that his story could end up being as fun to write as Rock's. Oda feels that unlike the older fighting game protagonists, Shun'ei has a one-of-a-kind world view, and his values change as he grows older. In regards to Isla, SNK wanted to introduce a rival to Shun'ei, so they let the design team to come up with whatever they could think of. The resulting draft had an impact on Oda, as it is very close to the final result, but he was initially worried about putting a character with that type of design into a fighting game. According to Eisuke Ogura, Isla is "not very much into actual fighting", and has a special and abnormal dance-like style. Despite Shun'ei being the protagonist the story will explore Isla's character as well.

Meanwhile, the character of Krohnen has been noted to have multiple similarities with K9999 from The King of Fighters 2001 and The King of Fighters 2002 due to his similarities with the character of Tetsuo from the manga Akira and had to be removed from the franchise based on copyright issues. Although SNK did not confirm his identity, artist Hiroaki was more open about it, calling him the revival of K9999. Among other characters, the previous subboss, Antonov, became a playable character as a regular member of the cast. Oda stated that he was further changed based on the team's idea in regards of a manager. The series' official website was updated with story prologues during development of the game. Although the game gave closure to Shun'ei's character arc, SNK is not satisfied with the result, believing they could still focus on the his role again.

Release
In June 2021, SNK announced that the game would be delayed to the first quarter of 2022, due to rising cases of COVID-19 in Japan. In July 2021, SNK announced that the game would be released on PlayStation 4, PlayStation 5, Windows, and Xbox Series X/S via the Microsoft Store, Epic Games Store and Steam. The game's global release is handled by the Embracer Group's Koch Media. A demo became available in Tokyo Game Show 2021 featuring a total of eight playable characters.

Downloadable content for the game include Terry Bogard's design from Garou: Mark of the Wolves and Leona Heidern's classic look from The King of Fighters '96 to The King of Fighters 2003. Other releases of the game include a two disc soundtrack and a 119-page artbook. Oda claims the game is being developed in order to be enjoyed for years after its release. As such, additional characters are planned to be added as downloadable content, with four teams set to be released in 2022. The first, Garou Team, was released on March 17 for most platforms, but was delayed until the next day on Steam. In addition, a free update on April 14 added Omega Rugal as a playable character to the game, and introduced the new Boss Challenge mode. Players who beat the stronger boss version of Rugal are rewarded with music, alternate costume, and a new stage. The second, South Town Team was released on May 16 for most platforms, music from KOF Neowave will be back in DJ Station Update. The third, Awakened Orochi Team was released on August 8 for most platforms. The fourth, Samurai Team has released on October 4 for most platforms. Shingo and Kim will be released in 2023 for most platforms along with Cross-platform play with all platform patch also coming in 2023.

Reception 

The King of Fighters XV received "generally favorable" reviews, with a better score than the predecessor, according to review aggregator Metacritic.

Destructoid gave the game an eight out of ten and wrote, "With fantastic fighting action, a compelling roster, splendid visuals, and revamped online options, KoF XV is a treat for both series veterans and the fighting game community at large, though newcomers may still find themselves dizzied by its myriad mechanics and steep learning curve." IGN praised the game's character models, rollback netcode, and roster, but heavily criticized the lack of content, insubstantial tutorialization, reused six year-old animations, and called its story mode "utterly bare bones." Shacknews similarly lauded the visual redesign, netcode, training modes, gameplay mechanics, music, and existing roster while panning its inaccessibility, overpowered mechanics, and the absence of major characters in the roster. GameSpot praised the distinct playstyles, team-based gameplay, large roster, new modes, and the online play, and criticized bad AI and the lack of substantial iteration over The King of Fighters XIV.

Producer Yasuyuki Oda believes that the players’ response to the game was overwhelmingly positive, which allowed them to properly work on early issues such as the online play.

The PlayStation 4 version of KoF XV was the 8th bestselling retail game during its first week of release in Japan, with 9,062 physical copies being sold. The PlayStation 5 version sold 2,414 physical copies in Japan throughout the same week, making it the 22nd bestselling retail game of the week in the country.

References

Notes

External links

2022 video games
PlayStation 4 games
PlayStation 5 games
SNK games
The King of Fighters games
Martial arts video games
Fighting games
Fighting games used at the Evolution Championship Series tournament
Multiplayer and single-player video games
Unreal Engine games
Video game sequels
Video games postponed due to the COVID-19 pandemic
Windows games
Xbox Series X and Series S games
Video games set in China
Video games set in Japan
Video games set in the United States
Video games set in Egypt
Video games set in France
Video games set in Italy
Video games set in Finland
Video games with AI-versus-AI modes
2.5D fighting games
Video games developed in Japan